Afghan leaders who met at the December 2001 Bonn Conference which picked Hamid Karzai to lead the Afghan Transitional Authority also agreed that a Constitutional Loya Jirga should be convened to draft a new constitution.

The Emergency Loya Jirga of 2002 set up an Afghan Constitutional Commission, of 35 members, which sat from October 2002 until March 2003, prior to submitting their draft to President Karzai.
That draft was made public in November 2003.

502 delegates were selected, via regional caucuses, to participate in the Constitutional Loya Jirga to debate, amend the draft.

In her thesis at the Naval Postgraduate School Zoe Sherman described the composition of the Constitutional Loya Jirga of 2002 as being unlike any previous Loya Jirga.

Ten committees were formed, each assigned to review specific articles.
The Constitutional Loya Jirga sat from December 13, 2003, to January 4, 2004.

Committee One: 45 articles, chaired by Ustad Rabani

Committee Two: 27 articles, chaired by Ustad Sayaf

Committee Three: 21 articles, chaired by Ahmad Nabi Muhammadi

Committee Four: 38 articles, chaired by Mohammad Tahir

Committee Five: 35 articles, chaired by Ayatullah Muhsini

Committee Six: 22 articles, chaired by Maulowi Gul Muhammad

Committee Seven: 40 articles, chaired by Dr. Mashahed

Committee Eight: 46 articles, chaired by Ustad Farid

Committee Nine: 36 articles, chaired by Hashmat Ghani Ahmadzai

Committee Ten: 29 articles, chaired by Maulowi Syd Muhammad Hanif

References

Politics of Afghanistan